The CRC Handbook of Chemistry and Physics is a comprehensive one-volume reference resource for science research. First published in 1914, it is currently in its 103rd edition, published in 2022. It is sometimes nicknamed the "Rubber Bible" or the "Rubber Book", as CRC originally stood for "Chemical Rubber Company".

As late as the 1962–1963 edition (3604 pages) the Handbook contained myriad information for every branch of science and engineering.  Sections in that edition include: Mathematics, Properties and Physical Constants, Chemical Tables, Properties of Matter, Heat, Hygrometric and Barometric Tables, Sound, Quantities and Units, and Miscellaneous.  Earlier editions included sections such as "Antidotes of Poisons", "Rules for Naming Organic Compounds", "Surface Tension of Fused Salts", "Percent Composition of Anti-Freeze Solutions", "Spark-gap Voltages", "Greek Alphabet", "Musical Scales", "Pigments and Dyes", "Comparison of Tons and Pounds", "Twist Drill and Steel Wire Gauges" and "Properties of the Earth's Atmosphere at Elevations up to 160 Kilometers".  Later editions focus almost exclusively on chemistry and physics topics and eliminated much of the more "common" information.

Contents by edition 
 22nd Edition – 44th Edition
 Section A: Mathematical Tables
 Section B: Properties and Physical Constants
 Section C: General Chemical Tables/Specific Gravity and Properties of Matter
 Section D: Heat and Hygrometry/Sound/Electricity and Magnetism/Light
 Section E: Quantities and Units/Miscellaneous
 Index
 45th Edition – 70th Edition
 Section A: Mathematical Tables
 Section B: Elements and Inorganic Compounds
 Section C: Organic Compounds
 Section D: General Chemical
 Section E: General Physical Constants
 Section F: Miscellaneous
 Index
 71st Edition – 102nd edition
 Section  1: Basic Constants, Units, and Conversion Factors
 Section  2: Symbols, Terminology, and Nomenclature
 Section  3: Physical Constants of Organic Compounds
 Section  4: Properties of the Elements and Inorganic Compounds
 Section  5: Thermochemistry, Electrochemistry, and Kinetics (or Thermo, Electro & Solution Chemistry)
 Section  6: Fluid Properties
 Section  7: Biochemistry
 Section  8: Analytical Chemistry
 Section  9: Molecular Structure and Spectroscopy
 Section 10: Atomic, Molecular, and Optical Physics
 Section 11: Nuclear and Particle Physics
 Section 12: Properties of Solids
 Section 13: Polymer Properties
 Section 14: Geophysics, Astronomy, and Acoustics
 Section 15: Practical Laboratory Data
 Section 16: Health and Safety Information
 Appendix A: Mathematical Tables
 Appendix B: CAS Registry Numbers and Molecular Formulas of Inorganic Substances (72nd – 75th)
 Appendix B: Sources of Physical and Chemical Data (83rd–)
 Index

In addition to an extensive line of engineering handbooks and references and textbooks across virtually all scientific disciplines, CRC is today also known as a leading publisher of books related to forensic sciences, forensic pathology, criminology, and police sciences.

References

External links 
 PDF copy of the 8th edition, published in 1920
 Handbook of Chemistry and Physics online 
 Tables Relocated or Removed from CRC Handbook of Chemistry and Physics, 71st through 87th Editions

Handbooks and manuals
Chemistry books
Physics books
Encyclopedias of science
CRC Press books
1914 non-fiction books